WCE can stand for:

West Coast Eagles, an Australian Football League team
West Coast Express, a commuter rail service out of Vancouver, British Columbia, Canada
Windows CE, an embedded version of Microsoft Windows
Winnipeg Commodity Exchange, a derivatives market based in Winnipeg, Canada
Capsule Endoscopy, a medical procedure involving swallowing a capsule with remote imaging capabilities
World Challenge Expeditions, a British expedition organising company
Wiener Chaos Expansion, another name for Polynomial chaos